CSPS may refer to:

 Calendar of State Papers Relating to Scotland. 1589–93. 13 vols. London: 1898–1969.
 Canadian Ski Patrol, an organization providing ski patrol services across Canada (now CSP)
 Christian Science Publishing Society, the publishing arm of The First Church of Christ, Scientist in Boston, Massachusetts
 Czech-Slovak Protective Society, an organization dedicated to the cultural preservation of Czech and Slovak immigrants in the United States
 The Canada School of Public Service, a government organization whose mandate is to provide a range of learning activities
 Canadian Society for Pharmaceutical Sciences